The 1896–97 City Cup was the third edition of the City Cup, a cup competition in Irish football.

The tournament was won by Glentoran for the first time.

Group standings

References

1896–97 in Irish association football